Rob Rotten is an American actor and film director known for his work on pornographic films, many of which incorporate elements and themes such as punk rock, horror, gonzo pornography, and tattoos. He retired from the adult entertainment industry in 2014.

Biography 

Personal life

Rob Rotten was married to Rachel Rotten.

Career

Rotten is the owner and president of Punx Productions, Inc., first created in 2001 and later incorporated in the State of California in 2004. Rotten entered the adult industry in 2001 as a pornographic performer. In 2003, he appeared in and co-directed the pornographic film Little Runaway, which received more than a dozen AVN Award nominations. Rotten began directing for the pornography distributor Metro in 2006, creating films such as Fuck the System, Porn of the Dead, and The Texas Vibrator Massacre. Rotten remained a Metro contract director until 2012. In addition to movies, Rotten has published a book, titled Bong Load Girls: The Book.

Awards 
 2009 AVN Award nominee – Best Videography – The Texas Vibrator Massacre
 2009 AVN Award nominee – Best Screenplay – The Texas Vibrator Massacre
 2009 AVN Award nominee – Best Director, Feature – The Texas Vibrator Massacre
 2010 AVN Award nominee - Best Vignette Release - "Bong Load Girls (Vol. 1)"
 2010 AVN Award nominee - Best Soundtrack - "Bong Load Girls (Vol. 1)"

References

External links 
 
 
 Rob Rotten at the Internet Adult Film Database
 
 Rob Rotten on MySpace

Alt porn
Living people
1981 births
Horror film directors
American parodists
American pornographic film directors
American pornographic film producers
American male pornographic film actors
Parody film directors